The 1980 Dayton Flyers football team was an American football team that represented the University of Dayton as an independent during the 1980 NCAA Division III football season. In their fourth and final season under head coach Rick E. Carter, the Flyers compiled a 14–0 record and outscored opponents by a total of 509 to 70.

Quarterback Jim O'Hara, linebacker Mark Schmitz, and strong safety Tim Schoen were the team captains. The team's statistical leaders included running back Gradlin Pruitt with 1,591 rushing yards and 1,980 yards of total offense and receiver Al Laubenthal with 883 receiving yards. Pruitt received the team's most valuable player award.  

Ten days after the championship game, Carter resigned as Dayton's head coach to accept the same position at Holy Cross. In January 1981, he was voted as the Division III Coach of the Year by the American Football Coaches Association (AFCA).

The team played its home games at Welcome Stadium in Dayton, Ohio.

Schedule

References

Dayton
Dayton Flyers football seasons
NCAA Division III Football Champions
College football undefeated seasons
Dayton Flyers football